Violeta Ayala (born Violeta Michelle Ayala Grageda; 16 February 1978) is a Bolivian-Australian Quechua filmmaker, artist and technologist. Her credits include Prison X – The Devil & The Sun, a VR animation set in a Neo Andean Metaverse that premiered at the Sundance Film Festival 2021 and the award winning documentaries Cocaine Prison(2017), The Fight(2017), The Bolivian Case(2015) and Stolen(2009).

Film career 
Ayala's latest work, Prison X, a virtual reality animated experience, premiered at the Sundance Film Festival in January 2021 to critical acclaim. Her previous feature Cocaine Prison was filmed inside San Sebastian prison in Cochabamba, by the inmates themselves, giving a unique perspective on the foot soldiers of the drug trade. Cocaine Prison premiered at the Toronto International Film Festival in September 2017 and has won the audience award at the Rencontres Cinémas d'Amérique Latine de Toulouse.

In 2017, Ayala also made The Fight, a short film about a protest by a group of people with disabilities that march across the Andes in wheelchairs and on foot for 35 days to the seat of the government in La Paz, asking to speak to President Evo Morales about a disability pension and were repressed by the police. The film was released worldwide by The Guardian in May 2017 and has won a Walkley Award, the Deutsche Welle Doc Dispatch Award at the Sheffield Doc/Fest, as well as a nomination for an IDA Documentary Award and was a finalist for the Rory Peck Sony Impact Award.

In 2015 Ayala made The Bolivian Case, a feature about a high profile case concerning three Norwegian teenage girls caught with 22 kg of cocaine in an airport in Bolivia. The film was shot in Cochabamba and Oslo, premiered in the Special Presentation Program at Toronto's Hot Docs Canadian International Documentary Festival in May 2015, has won an audience award at the Sydney Film Festival and was shortlisted for Platino Awards and Premios Fénix.

Ayala's feature directorial debut, the highly controversial documentary Stolen (2009), that uncovers slavery in the Sahrawi refugee camps in south-western Algeria and in Western Sahara also premiered internationally at the Toronto International Film Festival in September 2009. The film accolades include Best Feature Doc at the 2010 Pan African Film Festival in Los Angeles,[28] Grand Prix at the 2010 Art of the Document Film Festival in Warsaw,[29] Golden Oosikar Best Doc at the 2010 Anchorage International Film Festival,[30] Best Doc at the 2010 African Film Festival in Nigeria,[31] Audience Award at the 2010 Amnesty International Film Festival in Montreal,[32] Best Film at the 2010 Festival Internacional de Cine de Cuenca in Ecuador[33] and many more.

In 2006 Ayala began her collaboration with Dan Fallshaw on Between the Oil and the Deep Blue Sea, a documentary set in Mauritania, about corruption in the oil industry, that follows the investigations of mathematician Yahyia Ould Hamidoune against Woodside Petroleum. On the same subject Ayala co-wrote Slick Operator an article published in the front page of The Sydney Morning Herald.

Ayala is an alumnus of the Film Independent Documentary Lab, the Berlinale Talent Campus, HotDocs Forum, Britdoc Good Pitch, IFP and a Sundance and Tribeca Film Institute Fellow. Ayala has given masterclasses at the National Film and Television School in London and at the Scottish Documentary Institute as part of the Bridging The Gap Masterclasses.

Since June 2013 Ayala has been invited to host a blog at the Huffington Post as part of 12 bloggers writing about the War on Drugs, that include Susan Sarandon, Arianna Huffington and Russell Simmons.

In 2018, Ayala received a Jaime Escalante Medal in a ceremony organized by the Bolivian embassy in Washington for her extraordinary talent in cinema

On June 30, 2020, Ayala was invited to join the Academy of Motion Picture Arts and Sciences.

In June 2022, Ayala was invited to present Prison X at the Forum Des Images in Paris.

Art Projects
Ayala created Las Awichas (grandmothers in Aymara), a series of digital portraits with AI in honour of her female ancestors. The exhibition opened on 9/21/2022 at the Martadero one of the most prestigious art galleries in Bolivia.

Early life
Ayala was born in Cochabamba, Bolivia in 1978, the daughter of Fanny Grageda and Efrain Ayala. Ayala's maternal grandfather was the political Quechua leader Vitaliano Grageda, He was one of the founders and a former Secretary General of the Confederation of Peasant Workers of Bolivia. Vitaliano Grageda was an active member of The Communist Party of Bolivia.

Her mother was a biochemist and had a pharmacy, her father immigrated to Sydney, Australia when Ayala was a child. She has two half-brothers from her mother's subsequent relationship with doctor Roly Elias. She grew up in the south part of Cochabamba, one of the city's poorest areas. Following her mother's death in 1995, Ayala immigrated to Australia.

Ayala is a graduate of Charles Sturt University where she majored in Broadcast Journalism. She worked as a journalist at SBS Australia. Ayala has lived in Australia and the United States and has dual Bolivian-Australian nationality.

Personal life
Ayala is married to filmmaker Dan Fallshaw, with whom she has a child, born in June 2016.

Filmography
Proyecto Vila-Vila (2005, Documentary)
Between The Oil and The Deep Blue Sea (2005, Documentary)
Stolen (2009, Documentary)
The Bolivian Case (2015, Documentary)
The Fight (2017, Documentary)
Cocaine Prison (2017, Documentary)
Prison X (2021, VR Animation)

Awards

References

External links

Official website

1978 births
Living people
Australian film directors
Australian women film directors
Bolivian women film directors
Charles Sturt University alumni
People from Cochabamba